Caheraphuca wedge tomb is a wedge-shaped gallery grave and National Monument located near Crusheen in County Clare, Ireland.

Location
Caheraphuca wedge tomb is located in Caheraphuca townland of Inchicronan parish, immediately southwest of Crusheen, to the north of Inchicronan Lough.

History
Wedge tombs of this kind were built in Ireland in the late Neolithic and early Bronze Age, c. 2500–2000 BC. The name derives from Irish cathair an phúca, "dwelling of the púca."

Description
A long chamber of five stones supports two roofstones; these may originally have been a single roofstone that was later broken.

References

External links
 Caheraphuca wedge tomb at the Clare County Library

National Monuments in County Clare
Archaeological sites in County Clare
Tombs in the Republic of Ireland